Dale Crover is an EP by Melvins' drummer Dale Crover, which was released in 1992 through Boner Records.

The cover art for the album is a parody of the cover art from Peter Criss' 1978 solo release.

Buzz Osborne stated, according to a CMJ New Music article in 2005: "The whole idea [to do Kiss-esque solo albums] was a joke that went out of control."

Track listing
All songs written by Dale Crover.

Personnel
Dale Crover - lead vocals, backup vocals, rhythm guitar, lead guitar, drums
Debbi Shane - bass, backup vocals
Greg Freeman - producer, engineer
Harvey Bennett Stafford - cover and insert painting

References

1992 EPs
Melvins EPs
Boner Records albums
Dale Crover albums
Punk rock albums by American artists